is Rimi Natsukawa's sixth original album, released on . The album was a 2-CD set, with the first CD featuring studio recordings, and the second performances from her  tour. The limited edition also featured a DVD.

Background

Umui Kaji was released after two singles. "Sayōnara Arigatō (Ama no Kaze)/Mirai" in August 2006 was a re-arrangement of her song "Sayōnara Arigatō" (a single from Ayakaji no Ne) by the song's writer, Kentarō Kobuchi of Kobukuro. The second A-side, "Mirai," did not feature on the album. "Furusato" was written by singer Noriyuki Makihara, and was used as the theme song for the drama Asakusa Fukumaru Ryokan.

Contents

The studio disc features a greater variety of songwriters/arrangers than Natsukawa's previous works. "Unju no Furusato" was a collaboration between Chiharu Tamashiro of the band Kiroro and entertainer Gorie (who wrote the song's lyrics). It was used as the movie "Minami no Shima no Furimun"'s theme song (which starred Gorie). The bonus track, "Māmāhō," is a cover of the song sung by Josephine Siao in the 1960 Chinese film Ku Er Liu Lang Ji (苦兒流浪記). The original version features on "Famureuta."

The live disc was recorded at Natsukawa's Uta Sagashi no Tabi concert at the Chukyo University Culture Meeting Hall (中京大学文化市民会館) on December 23, 2008. Two exceptions are "Amazing Grace" and "Toki no Wakare ni Mi o Makase," which were recorded at the Machida town hall (町田市民ホール) on October the 24th, 2008.

The entire live disc is made up of cover songs. Tracks #1-#4 (as well as #9) are songs that did not make it onto the Uta Sagashi: Request Cover Album in 2007. Tracks #5-#8 are covers already released by Natsukawa (three tracks are from 2002's Minamikaze, and one from 2003's Sora no Keshiki)

The limited edition DVD features recordings from the December concert.

Track listing

All songs on the "In Concert" disc performed by the 54 Band.

Japan sales rankings

References

Rimi Natsukawa albums
2009 albums
Victor Entertainment albums